Per Jonas Karlsson (born 2 January 1986) is a Swedish former professional footballer who played as a defender. Making his senior debut for AIK in 2003, he made a club record 455 appearances for the club and helped the team win the 2009 and 2018 Allsvenskan titles. He won two caps for the Sweden national team between 2010 and 2015.

Club career
He came through the ranks of Solna club Vasalunds IF and was picked up by AIK as a teenager. After coming through the academy at AIK he secured a regular starting-spot at AIK in late 2004, but broke his leg in beginning of 2005 against Väsby United which ruled him out for much of that season. When he became fit again he was loaned out to Väsby United, a feeder club to AIK, for the 2006 season. However, he broke his arm this time and wasn't able to play any matches for them. During the 2007 season he was loaned out to Åtvidabergs FF in Superettan and was finally able to play a whole season. During 2008 he once again became a member of the regular starting eleven at AIK, which he had lost after his leg fracture in 2005.

He played in 26 Allsvenskan games as AIK won the 2009 Allsvenskan. 9 years later, he played in all 30 games as AIK won the 2018 Allsvenskan.

On 15 July 2020 he made his 396th appearance for AIK in a 2020 Allsvenskan 1-0 win against IK Sirius, surpassing Daniel Tjernström at 395 games and setting a club record. On 28 September 2020, Karlsson made his 322nd Allsvenskan appearance, breaking Gustav Sjöberg's record for most Allsvenskan appearances for AIK.

Karlsson retired from professional football after the 2022 Allsvenskan season.

International career 
Karlsson was a part of the Sweden U21 squad that advanced to the semifinals of the 2009 UEFA European Under-21 Championship that took place on Swedish home soil, but did not play.

Karlsson made his senior Sweden debut in January 2010 in a friendly game against Oman. He was called up to a 2014 FIFA World Cup qualifier against Germany as a replacement for Jonas Olsson, but did not play. He won his second cap in a friendly against the Ivory Coast in January 2015.

In May 2019, Karlsson was called up to Sweden's UEFA Euro 2020 qualifiers against Malta and Spain, but did not play.

Personal life
He goes by the nickname "Pertan".

Career statistics

Club

International 
Appearances and goals by national team and year

Honours
AIK
 Allsvenskan: 2009, 2018
 Svenska Cupen: 2009
 Svenska Supercupen: 2010
Individual
Allsvenskan Defender of the Year: 2013, 2018

Records 

 Most appearances for AIK: 455
 Most Allsvenskan appearances for AIK: 373

References

External links
Per Karlsson at aikfotboll.se 

 

1986 births
Living people
Footballers from Stockholm
Swedish footballers
Sweden international footballers
Sweden youth international footballers
Sweden under-21 international footballers
Association football defenders
Vasalunds IF players
AIK Fotboll players
AFC Eskilstuna players
Åtvidabergs FF players
Allsvenskan players
Superettan players